This article lists the squads for the 2013 CONCACAF Women's U-17 Championship, to be held in Jamaica. The 8 national teams involved in the tournament were required to register a squad of 20 players; only players in these squads were eligible to take part in the tournament.

Players marked (c) were named as captain for their national squad.

Group A

El Salvador
Coach: Geovanni Trigueros

Haiti
Coach:

Jamaica
Coach: Vinimore Blaine

Mexico
Coach: Leonardo Cuéllar

Group B

Canada
Coach: Beverly Priestman

Guatemala
Coach:

Trinidad and Tobago

United States
Coach: B. J. Snow

References 

Squads
2013 in youth sport